St Ruan is a hamlet in the civil parish of Grade-Ruan, west Cornwall, England, United Kingdom.

Hamlets in Cornwall